An entitative graph is an element of the diagrammatic syntax for logic that Charles Sanders Peirce developed under the name of qualitative logic beginning in the 1880s, taking the coverage of the formalism only as far as the propositional or sentential aspects of logic are concerned. See 3.468, 4.434, and 4.564 in Peirce's Collected Papers. Peirce wrote of this system in an 1897 Monist article titled "The Logic of Relatives", although he had mentioned logical graphs in an 1882 letter to O. H. Mitchell.

The syntax is:

 The blank page;
 Single letters, phrases;
 Dashes;
 Objects (subgraphs) enclosed by a simple closed curve called a cut. A cut can be empty.

The semantics are:

 The blank page denotes False;
 Letters, phrases, subgraphs, and entire graphs can be True or False;
 To surround objects with a cut is equivalent to Boolean complementation. Hence an empty cut denotes Truth;
 All objects within a given cut are tacitly joined by disjunction.
 A dash is read "everything" if it is encircled an even number of times, and read "something" if it is encircled an odd number of times.
Entitative graphs are read from outside to inside.

A "proof" manipulates a graph, using a short list of rules, until the graph is reduced to an empty cut or the blank page. A graph that can be so reduced is what is now called a tautology (or the complement thereof). Graphs that cannot be simplified beyond a certain point are analogues of the satisfiable formulas of first-order logic.

Peirce soon abandoned the entitative graphs for the existential graphs, whose sentential (alpha) part is dual to the entitative graphs. He developed the existential graphs until they became another formalism for what are now termed first-order logic and normal modal logic.

The primary algebra of G. Spencer-Brown's Laws of Form is isomorphic to the entitative graphs.

See also
 Charles Sanders Peirce bibliography

References

Bibliography 

 

 Peirce, C. S., Collected Papers of Charles Sanders Peirce, Vols. 1–6, Charles Hartshorne and Paul Weiss (eds.), Vols. 7–8, Arthur W. Burks, ed., Harvard University Press, Cambridge, MA, 1931–1935, 1958. Cited as CP volume.paragraph.
 Peirce, C. S., "Qualitative Logic", MS 736 (c. 1886), pp. 101–115 in The New Elements of Mathematics by Charles S. Peirce, Volume 4, Mathematical Philosophy, Carolyn Eisele (ed.), Mouton, The Hague, 1976.
 Peirce, C. S., "Qualitative Logic", MS 582 (1886), pp. 323–371 in Writings of Charles S. Peirce: A Chronological Edition, Volume 5, 1884–1886, Peirce Edition Project (eds.), Indiana University Press, Bloomington, IN, 1993.
 Peirce, C. S., "The Logic of Relatives: Qualitative and Quantitative", MS 584 (1886), pp. 372–378 in Writings of Charles S. Peirce: A Chronological Edition, Volume 5, 1884–1886, Peirce Edition Project (eds.), Indiana University Press, Bloomington, IN, 1993.
 Shin, Sun-Joo (2002), The Iconic Logic of Peirce's Graphs, MIT Press, Cambridge, MA.

Charles Sanders Peirce
Diagrams
History of logic
History of mathematics
Mathematical logic
Philosophical logic